Wang Fa (Chinese: 王珐; born 17 January 1993 in Shenyang) is a Chinese football player who currently plays for China League Two side Shaoxing Shangyu Pterosaur.

Club career
In 2012, Wang Fa started his professional football career with Changchun Yatai in the Chinese Super League. In February 2013, he was transferred to the Chinese Super League side Liaoning Whowin. He made his senior league debut for Liaoning on 3 November 2013 in a game against Changchun Yatai, coming on as a substitute for Zhang Xiaoyu in the 75th minute.

Club career statistics 
Statistics accurate as of match played 2 November 2019.

References

External links
 

1993 births
Living people
Chinese footballers
Footballers from Shenyang
Changchun Yatai F.C. players
Liaoning F.C. players
China League One players
Chinese Super League players
Association football midfielders